Winne Hung Wing-yan (born 10 April 1999) is a rower from Hong Kong. She competed in the 2020 Summer Olympics, held July–August 2021 in Tokyo.

References

1999 births
Living people
Hong Kong female rowers
Olympic rowers of Hong Kong
Rowers at the 2020 Summer Olympics
Asian Games competitors for Hong Kong
Rowers at the 2018 Asian Games